The Wideboys are an English electronic music duo known for club remixes and for their own song "Sambuca", featuring Dennis G on vocals, which reached number 15 in the UK in October 2001. Another top 40 single, "Daddy-O" featuring Shaznay Lewis, reached No. 32 in 2008.

The Wideboys compose and release many of their own productions, especially favouring the 12-inch vinyl format for club DJs. In 1998, they began producing dance remixes of songs by other artists, which led to fame in 2000 for two remixes featuring Craig David on vocals: "Re-Rewind" and "Woman Trouble", both by Artful Dodger. With this success, they began to remix songs by more widely known artists such as Kylie Minogue, Rihanna, Girls Aloud, Taio Cruz and the Pussycat Dolls. In 2009, they initiated a series of dance mix albums on the Ministry of Sound label. They are also known for composing the theme tune for Wheeler Dealers.

See also
List of songs remixed by Wideboys

References

External links
Wideboys on Facebook

British record production teams
English electronic music duos
Electronic dance music duos
Male musical duos
UK garage duos
Record production duos
Remixers
679 Artists artists
Ministry of Sound artists
Locked On Records artists